Urena is the genus of plants, which grow in various tropical and subtropical areas worldwide. Some view the plant as a weed, but others make use of its fiber for various purposes. The leaves and flowers are also a famine food in Africa.  Its seeds are spread by animals.  Fibers obtained from it are used for making coffee sacks in Brazil.

Gallery

References

Hibisceae
Malvaceae genera